The 2019 World Junior Ice Hockey Championship Division III consisted of eight teams split into two groups of four. The team that won the Division was promoted to Division II B for 2020. It was held from 14 to 20 January 2019.

To be eligible as a junior, a player cannot be born earlier than 1999.
Bulgarian forward Miroslav Vasilev became the all-time leading scorer in Division III play with 42 points.

Participants

Preliminary round
All times are local (UTC±0).

Group A

Group B

Placement round

Bracket

5–8th place semifinals

Seventh place game

Fifth place game

Playoff round

Bracket

Semifinals

Bronze medal game

Gold medal game

Final ranking

Statistics

Top 10 scorers

GP = Games played; G = Goals; A = Assists; Pts = Points; +/− = Plus-minus; PIM = Penalties In Minutes
Source: IIHF

Goaltending leaders
(minimum 40% team's total ice time)

TOI = Time on ice (minutes:seconds); GA = Goals against; GAA = Goals against average; Sv% = Save percentage; SO = Shutouts
Source: IIHF

Awards

Best Players Selected by the Directorate

 Goaltender:  Hung Sheng-Chun
 Defenceman:  Zhang Dehan
 Forward:  Heidar Kristveigarson

External links
IIHF.com

III
World Junior Ice Hockey Championships – Division III
International ice hockey competitions hosted by Iceland
2019 in Icelandic sport
Sports competitions in Reykjavík
IIHF